The Amur River Tunnel (Russian: , during its construction — стройка No.4) is a 7200-meter-long railroad tunnel on the Trans-Siberian Railroad, in Khabarovsk, Russia. It was built during 1937—42 for giving an alternate route for the Khabarovsk Bridge across the Amur River. This tunnel is the only underwater tunnel in the Russian Railroad System.

The concept of drilling a tunnel underneath the Amur River arose in connection with the construction of the Trans-Siberian Railroad. In 1913, at the exhibition of the plans , there was a drawing of the tunnel, but the choice had already been made in favor of the bridge.

During the 1930s, the construction of a second track for the Trans-Siberian Railroad east of Irkutsk was undertaken. The need to build this tunnel was caused by the Japanese invasion of Manchuria in 1931, and the loss of the Chinese Eastern Railway. Accordingly, the bridge at Khabarovsk was vulnerable to the Japanese air raids. In 1936, because of the particular strategic importance for the country's Trans-Siberian Railroad, the Kremlin decided to build under the urging of the General Staff of the Red Army.

The technical design of the underwater 7,200 meter-long tunnel was carried out in 1937 by the Metroproject Institute which was then in the People's Commissariat of Communications of the USSR

The seven kilometer-long-railroad tunnel had been covered with five boards ??, 3627 meter-long mountain way?? (three faces) in the eastern sector, 1350 meters of open way in the western section, and an internal ?? diameter tunnel - 7400 mm for underwater. Using crushed stone, construction of houses and other surface structures carried out by railway troops. 900 experts in the primary professions and thousands of local civilian citizens worked directly in the tunnel under the Amur. About 5500 people worked only towards "construction № 4", a code name. Prisoners working in the Tunguska and in the New Stone ?? quarried limestone for buildings. The Magnitogorsk plant on the Ural River supplied the iron tubing to line the tunnel. 

Shortly prior to the Great Patriotic War, the work was nearing completion. In 1941, after the outbreak of the war, Joseph Stalin set a time limit on completing the building of the railway. On 12 July 1941, the first train with builders on it ran through the tunnel. Regular traffic started on 25 October 1942.

During 1944–45, cargo transportation for the upcoming invasion of Manchuria against Japan began. In accordance with the order of the People's Commissar of Railways Ivan Vladimirovich Kovalev of 22 May 1945 on the Far Eastern Railway to expedite the work, procedures was put in place to skip all forms of transportation and military compounds. After the fighting in the Far East was over in August 1945, the secret tunnel facility was temporarily closed. Because of the growth in freight traffic, there was the need to increase the capacity of the Trans-Siberian Railroad in 1964. The tunnel was the used for the movement of freight trains. After the completion of the electrification of the railway through the tunnel, passenger trains began to pass through it.

Until 2008 the combination through Amur River was continued - on the railway bridge and the tunnel. In 2009, after completion of the second stage of the reconstruction of Amur bridge opening two-way traffic across it, the "bottleneck" problem has been removed. This made it possible to reconstruct the underwater tunnel, after which the construction of the Trans-Siberian Amur link was on three tracks - two on the bridge, and one in the tunnel. 

Beside the eastern tunnel portal, there is a granite plate with words:

See also
Two related construction:
 Sakhalin Tunnel
 Bridges in Kyiv (Underwater tunnels)

Notes

References
 фотографии энциклопедии transsib.ru Сергей Сигачев

Railway tunnels in Russia
Trans-Siberian Railway
Amur River
Buildings and structures in Khabarovsk Krai
Khabarovsk
Rail transport in Khabarovsk Krai